"Floetic" is the debut single by Floetry, released in August 2002. It is from their debut studio album Floetic, and was written primarily by lead singer Marsha Ambrosius. The song contains a sample of the Jack Bruce cover of Mel Tormés song "Born to Be Blue". It peaked at No. 29 on the Billboard R&B chart in 2002.

In 2003, the song was nominated for Grammy Awards for Best R&B Song and Best Urban/Alternative Performance, but lost to "Love of My Life" by Erykah Badu and Common; and "Little Things" by India.Arie, respectively.

Music video

The official music video for the song was directed by Marc Klasfeld.

Chart positions

References

External links
 
 

2002 songs
2002 debut singles
DreamWorks Records singles
Floetry songs
Music videos directed by Marc Klasfeld
Polydor Records singles
Songs written by Marsha Ambrosius
Songs written by Mel Tormé
Songs written by Robert Wells (songwriter)